Thabang Johnny Lebese (24 August 1973 – 22 February 2012) was a South African footballer who played at both professional and international levels, as a midfielder.

Club career

Lebese played youth football for Orlando Wanderers and Orlando Hotspurs, and professionally for Kaizer Chiefs, Ria Stars, Orlando Pirates, Silver Stars, Moroka Swallows, Black Leopards and Dynamos. In total, he made 279 appearances in the Premier Soccer League during his 13-year career.

International career

Lebese earned one cap for South Africa in 1998, in a COSAFA Cup match against Namibia.

Later life and death
Lebese died on 22 February 2012, at the age of 38, from an AIDS-related illness.

References

1973 births
2012 deaths
South African soccer players
South Africa international soccer players
Kaizer Chiefs F.C. players
Orlando Pirates F.C. players
Sportspeople from Soweto
Black Leopards F.C. players
Platinum Stars F.C. players
Association football midfielders
Moroka Swallows F.C. players
AIDS-related deaths in South Africa
Dynamos F.C. (South Africa) players